Violin Sonata in F major may refer to:
 Violin Sonata No. 5 (Beethoven)
 Violin Sonata (Dvořák)
 Violin sonata in F major (HWV 370), by George Frideric Handel
 Violin Sonata in F major (Mendelssohn, 1820)
 Violin Sonata in F major (Mendelssohn, 1838)
 Violin Sonata No. 36 (Mozart)